Ivan Stoyanov (born 25 July 1994) is a Bulgarian footballer who plays as a defender for Nesebar.

References

External links

1994 births
Living people
Bulgarian footballers
First Professional Football League (Bulgaria) players
PFC Nesebar players
PFC Chernomorets Burgas players
FC Septemvri Sofia players
Association football defenders
People from Burgas Province